Melancholic Princess is a Taiwanese comic book series (called manhua in Taiwan) written and illustrated by the comic artist , serialized in Weekend Comics since 1989 and published by  in 1991. The series is the 1st installment of The Seven Mirrors' Stories collection, followed by The King of Blaze.

Plot summary
Ling-ling Mausoleum, an untouched Tʻang dynasty (7th century) tomb is discovered by Robert, an American journalist and a close friend of Wei Yung-chʻien's father, who is a Taiwanese-American archaeologist living in New York City. Joined by another friend, the four travel to mainland China to inspect the mausoleum. The occupant is a mysterious princess whose name has never been recorded in any historical documents, and who appears in Yung-chʻien's recurring dreams. The resurrection of the princess leads to a series of other startling revelations which put Yung-chʻien in unpredictable danger.

Main characters
 Hua Chʻêng
Goddess of Water, the love of Shang Hsüan. She is the only female among the seven gods.

 Li Ying
Hua Chêng's first reincarnation in the Tang dynasty, princess of Kuang-yü, fictional daughter of Emperor Kao-tsung and Empress Wu Tsê-tʻien, who falls in love with Hao Yüeh. She has supernatural abilities such as making flowers or other objects fly in the air, also she herself can fly, walk on water, go through walls, etc.

 Wei Yung-chʻien
Hua Chêng's second reincarnation (Li Ying's reincarnation) in present day, a 16-year-old Taiwanese-American girl living in New York City, falls in love with Shang Hsüan.

 Hao Yüeh
God of Thunder, reincarnated in the Tʻang dynasty as an imperial general and bodyguard of princess Li Ying, the two fall in love with each other.

 Shang Hsüan
God of Creation and Universe, the leader of the seven gods. He has a romantic relationship with Hua Chêng.

 Robert
An American journalist and a good friend of Wei Yung-chien's father, who discovered the mausoleum of princess Li Ying.

List of volumes
 Second original edition

 New edition

Sidequel

A sidequel of Melancholic Princess titled Dream of the Tʻang Dynasty Palace which written and illustrated by the same comic artist and published by Da Ran Culture in 1994, printed in colour. This is a short side story that tells the lonely princess Li Ying felt bored in the palace, so she sneaked out and encountered the shih-kan-tang. The latter thought she is a demoness and ready to kill her, but the general Hao Yüeh saved her just in time.

Adaptations
 TV series adaptation
The main characters and portions of Melancholic Princess were used and loosely interpreted, in the 2018 television series adaptation of The King of Blaze. The adaptation is seen to be unsuccessful, and disappointed a number of viewers. It has been questioned by the audience if the series is anything like the manhua except the names of some main characters.

 Novel
A novel of the same name written and adapted by Taiwanese author Nalan Chên, was published in 1992.

References

External links 

Taiwanese comics titles
1989 comics debuts
Fantasy comics
Romance comics
Action-adventure comics
Comics set in the Tang dynasty
Comics set in New York City
Comics set in Taiwan
Comics adapted into novels
Manhua adapted into television series
Archaeology in popular culture
Fiction about reincarnation
Fiction about resurrection
Supernatural fiction
Taiwanese novels